Harposcleritia is a genus of moths belonging to the family Tortricidae.

Species
Harposcleritia stictoneura (Meyrick, 1930)

See also
List of Tortricidae genera

References

External links
tortricidae.com

Euliini
Tortricidae genera